Corrosion loop(s) are systematized analysis "loops" used during Risk-based inspection analysis.
Both terms “RBI Corrosion loops” or “RBI corrosion circuits” are generic terms used to indicate the systematization of piping systems into usable and understandable parts associated with corrosion.  
Systematized piping loops or circuits are systems used in Risk Based Inspection analysis to assess the likelihood and consequence of failure.  
Other systematization may also prove useful, such as, i.e. inspection, consequence, materials of construction and chemistry.   
The system (or sub systems) maybe used to identify, pressure / temperature, subsequent failure mechanism and possible failure rate.
They may be based upon Construction drawings, Process Flow diagrams or Piping & Instrument diagrams as required. Each loop or circuit maybe identified using a unique code, with description about; process, material & degradation mode, material, cladding, C.A, specs.
See system model comes under the general heading of system analysis the terms analysis and synthesis come from Greek where they mean respectively "to take apart" and "to put together".   See also systems theory:
Note the exact definition of the systematized risk analysis " loop" is left to the reader and their requirements of the system analysis required, however to ensure consistency and that the expected results is produced, this should be defined before they are constructed.
It is suggested that a “true” corrosion loop should be a grouping were the degradation mechanism is "likely" to be the same i.e.
Material of Construction,
Process fluid (similar stream properties),
Temperature (roughly, or at least within the damage mechanisms susceptibility thresholds),
Pressure (if the damage mechanism/s of concern is/are reliant upon pressure), and
Velocity (again (if the damage mechanism of concern is reliant upon velocity).
By defining the barrier limits of Damage Susceptible Areas, the susceptibility of any part is similar to that of the whole.

References
1 API 570 (Nov. 2009) definition and notes re "piping circuits" Piping Inspection Code: In-service Inspection, Rating,Repair, and Alteration of Piping Systems, Third Edition

2 4th European-American Workshop on Reliability of NDE Tools and Methodologies for Pipework Inspection Data Analysis Peter VAN DE CAMP, Fred HOEVE, Sieger TERPSTRA, Shell Global Solutions International, Amsterdam, The Netherlands (http://www.ndt.net/article/reliability2009/Inhalt/we2a4.pdf)

3 Risk Management Application on Refinery Pipeline Inspection Ren-Rong Chang* Jin-Jhy Jeng** Shang Lai Lee*** *  Inspection Engineer of CPC Shell Lubricants Co.,LTD.  **  Inspection Engineer of Chinese Petroleum Corp. ***  Head inspection of Kaohsiung Plant of Chinese Petroleum Corp. (www.aposho.org/conference/img/csiii-b4.doc)

4 Risk Based Management ASME Seminar By Chow NgaiMun M.Sc., Ceng, FIMMM, AWS CWI, ASNT/ACCP/EN 473 Level III (UT, RT, MT, PT), PCN Level II TOFD, API 653, 510, 570, 580 and 571 Singapore Welding Society (1st Vice President) Engineering Manager (Shell Chemicals Seraya Pte Ltd).
(http://www.psig.sg/Seminar/S2011-2.pdf)

5 Risk Based Inspection Application on Refinery and Processing Piping Ren-Rong Chang1*, Chi-Min Shu1, Ming-Kuen Chang1 and Kung-Nan Lin2
1 Department of Safety, Health and Environmental Engineering, National Yunlin University of Science and Technology, 123, University Road, Section 3, Touliu, Yunlin, Taiwan 640, ROC 2 Department of Marine Engineering, National Taiwan Ocean University, 2, Pei-Ning Road, 
Keelung, Taiwan 20224, ROC (www.iitk.ac.in/che/jpg/papersb/full%20papers/S%20-%2084%20.doc)

Maintenance
Corrosion